Nueva Ecija's 1st congressional district is one of the four congressional districts of the Philippines in the province of Nueva Ecija. It has been represented in the House of Representatives of the Philippines since 1928. The district consists of the western municipalities of Aliaga, Cuyapo, Guimba, Licab, Nampicuan, Quezon, Santo Domingo, Talavera and Zaragoza. It is currently represented in the 19th Congress by Mikaela Angela B. Suansing of the Nacionalista Party (NP).

Representation history

Election results

2022

2019

2016

2013

2010

See also
Legislative districts of Nueva Ecija

References

Congressional districts of the Philippines
Politics of Nueva Ecija
1926 establishments in the Philippines
Congressional districts of Central Luzon
Constituencies established in 1926
Constituencies disestablished in 1972
Constituencies established in 1987